In machine tools, a spindle is a rotating axis of the machine, which often has a shaft at its heart. The shaft itself is called a spindle, but also, in shop-floor practice, the word often is used metonymically to refer to the entire rotary unit, including not only the shaft itself, but its bearings and anything attached to it (chuck, etc.).

A machine tool may have several spindles, such as the headstock and tailstock spindles on a bench lathe. The main spindle is usually the biggest one. References to "the spindle" without further qualification imply the main spindle. Some machine tools that specialize in high-volume mass production have a group of 4, 6, or even more main spindles. These are called multispindle machines. For example, gang drills and many screw machines are multispindle machines. Although a bench lathe has more than one spindle (counting the tailstock), it is not called a multispindle machine; it has one main spindle.

Examples of spindles include

 On a lathe (whether wood lathe or metal lathe), the spindle is the heart of the headstock.
 In rotating-cutter woodworking machinery, the spindle is the part on which shaped milling cutters are mounted for cutting features (such as rebates, beads, and curves) into mouldings and similar millwork.
 Similarly, in rotating-cutter metalworking machine tools (such as milling machines and drill presses), the spindle is the shaft to which the tool (such as a drill bit or milling cutter) is attached (for example, via a chuck).
 Varieties of spindles include grinding spindles, electric spindles, machine tool spindles, low-speed spindles, high speed spindles, and more.

High speed spindle 
High speed spindles are used strictly in machines, like CNC mills, designed for metal work. There are two types of high speed spindles, each with different designs:

Belt-driven spindle 
Consisting of spindle and bearing shafts held within the spindle housing, the belt-driven spindle is powered by an external motor connected via a belt-pulley system.

 External Motor: can be changed to create higher power and torque
 Max speeds: 12,000-15,000 RPM
 Advantage: cost effective
 Disadvantage: limited max speed limits applications

Integral motor spindle 
A main component of this spindle is the motor, stored internally.

 Internal Motor: limited power and torque due to restricted space within the spindle housing
 Speed Range: 20,000-60,000 RPM (top speed according to design)
 Advantage: high top speed expands application use
 Disadvantage: sensitive life range according to use

Both types, the belt-driven and the integral motor spindles, have advantages and disadvantages according to their design. Which one is more desirable depends on the purpose of the machine and product(s) being produced.

Design features 
A key design feature of any type of spindle is the use of support bearings that keep the shaft in its working position (horizontal or vertical) and prevent it from running out of alignment. Low-cost spindles are usually fitted with the simplest roller bearings. Units with high requirements to minimise radial run-out are equipped with hydrodynamic plain bearings. High-speed precision machine tools use hydrostatic and magnetic bearings, ensuring axial deviations of no more than 0.5 µm. These bearings are used in most CNC machines today.

Another special feature of the spindle design is its own cooling system. Since the spindle is mechanically directly coupled with the workpiece or tool being machined, the heat generated during machining is absorbed by the clamping unit and the shaft, causing thermal deformation of the spindle components. This effect is prevented by the cooling lubricant that washes around the special technological cavities inside the spindle, thus eliminating the conditions for deformation.

References

External links

Machine tools

de:Spindel
io:Spindelo